James Phillips (born 9 March 1963) is a South African former cricketer. He played in one first-class and one List A match for Border in 1987/88.

See also
 List of Border representative cricketers

References

External links
 

1963 births
Living people
South African cricketers
Border cricketers
People from Queenstown, South Africa
Cricketers from the Eastern Cape